Polysteganus is a genus of fish in the family Sparidae.

Species
There are currently 8 recognized species in this genus:
 Polysteganus baissaci M. M. Smith, 1978 (French-man seabream)
 Polysteganus cerasinus Iwatsuki & Heemstra, 2015 
 Polysteganus coeruleopunctatus (Klunzinger, 1870) (Blue-skin seabream) 
 Polysteganus flavodorsalis	Iwatsuki & Heemstra, 2015 
 Polysteganus lineopunctatus (Boulenger, 1903) 
 Polysteganus mascarenensis Iwatsuki & Heemstra, 2011 (Mascarene red seabream) 
 Polysteganus praeorbitalis (Günther, 1859) (Scotsman seabream)
 Polysteganus undulosus (Regan, 1908) (Seventy-four seabream)

References

Sparidae
Taxa named by Carl Benjamin Klunzinger
Marine fish genera